Hiegel is a surname. Notable people with the surname include:

Catherine Hiegel (born 1946), French actress
Hans Robert Hiegel (born 1954), German architect